C8 is a French free-to-air television channel owned by Groupe Canal+

History 
D8 was launched in 2012, replacing Direct 8, after purchasing it to Groupe Bolloré.

D8 was rebranded C8 on 5 September 2016.

C8 was unable to air in Belgium, because Plug RTL had the Belgian rights of Touche pas à mon poste !. C8 has not renewed the contract with RTL, in order to set up in Belgium in January 2020. The Belgian feed was launched on 28 April 2020.

Programmes

Entertainment 

 Touche pas à mon poste !, presented by Cyril Hanouna
 Voyage au bout de la nuit, night reading of famous literary works by actors (show named after the eponymous novel)
 Domino Day, presented by Valérie Bénaïm
 Le Grand Bêtisier, presented by Justine Fraioli & Caroline Ithurbide
 Le Zap
 La folle soirée du Palmashow

Game shows 

 L'Œuf ou la Poule ?, presented by Sebastien Cauet
 Still Standing, presented by Julien Courbet
 Guess My Age, presented by Jean-Luc Lemoine
 Hold Up!, presented by Benjamin Castaldi
 Couple ou pas couple ?, presented by Jean-Luc Lemoine

Infotainment 

 Focus, presented by Guy Lagache
 Les Mystères, presented by Cécile de Ménibus
 Au cœur de l'enquête, presented by Adrienne de Malleray
 Histoire interdite, presented by Guy Lagache

Info / Talk 
 C8 le JT, presented by Émilie Besse
 Langue de bois s'abstenir, presented by Philippe Labro
 La Nouvelle Édition, presented by Daphné Bürki
 Salut les Terriens !, presented by Thierry Ardisson

Lifestyle 

 Les Animaux de la 8, presented by Élodie Ageron and Sandrine Arcizet
 À vos régions, presented by Grégory Galiffi
 À vos recettes, presented by Grégory Galiffi

Hosts 
 Élodie Ageron (since 2012)
 Capucine Anav (since 2016)
 Sandrine Arcizet (since 2012)
 Thierry Ardisson (since 2016)
 Valérie Bénaïm (since 2012)
 Émilie Besse (since 2016)
 Laurent Boyer (since 2016)
 Benjamin Castaldi (2015 and since 2016) 
 Cécile de Ménibus (since 2016)
 Caroline Delage (since 2017)
 Alexandre Delpérier (since 2012) 
 Justine Fraioli (since 2013)
 Grégory Galiffi (since 2012)
 Cyril Hanouna (since 2012)
 Caroline Ithurbide (since 2012)
 Philippe Labro (since 2012)
 Vincent Lagaf' (since 2018) 
 Jean-Luc Lemoine (since 2012) 
 William Leymergie (since 2017)
 Victor Robert (since 2018)
 Carole Rousseau (since 2018)
 Patrick Sabatier (since 2018)
 Pascal Soetens (since 2017)

Columnists
 Francesca Antoniotti (since 2013) 
 Agathe Auproux (since 2017)
 Laurent Baffie (since 2016)
 Damien Canivez (since 2016)
 Christophe Carrière (since 2012) 
 Bertrand Chameroy (2012-2016, since 2018)
 Jean-Michel Cohen (since 2017) 
 Tatiana-Laurens Delarue (since 2018)
 Matthieu Delormeau (since 2015) 
 Rokhaya Diallo (since 2017)
 Raquel Garrido (since 2017)
 Franz-Olivier Giesbert (since 2017)
 Maxime Guény (since 2017)
 Stéphanie Loire (2015 and since 2016)
 Émilie Lopez (since 2015) 
 Mathieu Madénian (since 2017)
 Géraldine Maillet (since 2016)
 Jean-Michel Maire (since 2012) 
 Bernard Montiel (since 2013)
 Danielle Moreau (since 2017)
 Isabelle Morini-Bosc (since 2013)  
 Tanguy Pastureau (since 2017)
 Natacha Polony (since 2017)
 Ludivine Rétory (since 2017)
 Renaud Revel (since 2017)
 Hapsatou Sy (since 2012)
 Titoff (since 2017)
 Gilles Verdez (since 2013)
 Thibaud Vézirian (2015-2016/since 2018)
 Tom Villa (since 2016) 
 Alex Vizorek (since 2017)

Formers hosts and columnists
 Raymond Aabou (2015-2017)
 Rachid Arhab (2017)
 Brahim Asloum (2016)
 Élé Asu (2012-2016)
 Roselyne Bachelot (2012-2016)
 Nadège Beausson-Diagne (2014-2016)
 Nabilla Benattia (2014)
 Magali Bertin (2014-2016) 
 Élisabeth Bost (2012-2016) 
 Daphné Bürki (2016-2017)
 Cartman (2012-2015)
 Sébastien Cauet (2016-2017)
 Élise Chassaing (2012-2013)
 Jérémy Chatelain (2013-2016)
 Christelle Chollet (2014)
 Laurie Cholewa (2016)
 Camille Combal (2012-2018)
 Julien Courbet (2014-2018)
 Estelle Denis (2015-2017)
 Miguel Derennes (2014-2015)
 Nicolas Domenach (2016-2017)
 Raymond Domenech (2015-2016)
 Issa Doumbia (2015-2017) 
 Jean-Philippe Doux (2016-2017)
 Éric Dussart (2015-2016)
 Dominique Farrugia (2017)
 Jérémy Ferrari (2013)
 Laurence Ferrari (2012-2017)
 Aude Gogny-Goubert (2016) 
 Élodie Gossuin-Lacherie (2014) 
 Dominique Grimault (2015-2016)
 Stéphane Guillon (2016-2017)
 Jeremstar (2017-2018) 
 Shera Kerienski (2016) 
 Chantal Ladesou (2014)
 Alexia Laroche-Joubert (2012-2013)
 Marc-Antoine Le Bret (2014-2015) 
 Catherine Laborde (2017)
 Guy Lagache (2012-2017)
 Fabien Lecœuvre (2016-2017)
 Xavier Leherpeur (2013-2014)
 Annie Lemoine (2013)
 Angela Lorente (2015)
 Gérard Louvin (2012-2014, 2015)
 Énora Malagré (2012-2017)
 Adrienne de Malleray (2012-2016) 
 Hélène Mannarino (2015-2016)
 Nathalie Marquay (2015)
 Sebastian Marx (2016)
 Ariane Massenet (2013-2014)
 Emmanuel Maubert (2014-2015)
 Pierre Ménès (2015-2017) 
 Julia Molkhou (2017-2018)
 Thierry Moreau (2012-2017)
 Louis Morin (2017)
 Erika Moulet (2015-2016)
 Véronique Mounier (2017-2018)
 Jean-Pierre Montanay (2012-2016)  
 Clio Pajczer (2016-2017) 
 Julien Pasquet (2015-2016)
 Florent Peyre (2014)
 Guillaume Pley (2016-2017)
 Audrey Pulvar (2012-2017) 
 Stéphanie Renouvin (2013-2015)
 Daniel Riolo (2015-2016)
 Bruno Roger-Petit (2014)
 Daphné Roulier (2012-2013)
 Gyselle Soares (2014) 
 Sophie Thalmann (2015)
 Aïda Touihri (2015-2016)
 Philippe Vandel (2012-2016)
 Mélody Vilbert (2014)
 François Viot (2014-2017)
 Myriam Weil (2012-2016)  
 Ariel Wizman (2016-2017)

See also
 Canal+ Group
 Direct 8
 Canal Star

References

External links
  

Television stations in France
Television channels and stations established in 2012
2012 establishments in France
French-language television stations
Canal+